Epiepischnia is a monotypic snout moth genus described by Hans Georg Amsel in 1954. Its single species, Epiepischnia pseudolydella, described by the same author, is found in Iran.

References

Phycitinae
Monotypic moth genera
Moths of Asia
Taxa named by Hans Georg Amsel
Pyralidae genera